On the House may refer to: 

 On the House (album), by hip hop super group Slaughterhouse
 On the House (TV series), a British television comedy
 On the House (animated TV series), an upcoming adult, animated television comedy
 On the House (horse)
 On the House, a house music group membering Marshall Jefferson
 On The House with the Carey Brothers, a syndicated weekend radio show on home repair
 On the House: A Washington Memoir, a book by John Boehner

See also 
Gratis versus libre